Lin Kuo-hua (19 September 1935 – 27 July 2016) was a Taiwanese politician.

Early life
Lin was born in Gukeng, Yunlin, in 1935. He attended Taichung Municipal Taichung First Senior High School and completed a degree in civil engineering at National Taiwan University.

Activism and political career
He was elected to the Legislative Yuan as a representative of Yunlin County affiliated with the Democratic Progressive Party for the first time in 1998, and won a second term in 2001. During his unsuccessful reelection bid in 2004, Lin was investigated for bribery, as were fellow candidates Ho Chin-sung and Chen Chiang-sun. In 2005, Lin lost a party primary for the Yunlin County magistracy election to  Su Chih-fen. He was later appointed vice chairman of the Council of Agriculture (COA). While serving within the COA, Lin was named a trustee of the Straits Exchange Foundation in September 2006.

Personal life
Lin was married to Huang Fu-mei, who was a member of the National Assembly. Their daughter Lin Hui-ju served as mayor of Gukeng and on the Yunlin County Council. In January 2007, Lin Kuo-hua underwent surgery to remove blood clots from his brain. Lin died on 27 July 2016.

References

1935 births
2016 deaths
Democratic Progressive Party Members of the Legislative Yuan
Yunlin County Members of the Legislative Yuan
Members of the 3rd Legislative Yuan
Members of the 4th Legislative Yuan
Government ministers of Taiwan
National Taiwan University alumni
Taiwanese activists
Farmers' rights activists